The Russian First Division 2004 was the 13th edition of Russian First Division. There were 22 teams.

Teams

Standings

Top goalscorers

See also
Russian Premier League 2004

References
 PFL

2
Russian First League seasons
Russia
Russia